Erioptera nielseni is a species of fly in the family Limoniidae. It is found in the Palearctic.

References

External links
Images representing Erioptera at BOLD

Limoniidae
Insects described in 1921
Nematoceran flies of Europe